The A54 autoroute is a toll motorway in France managed by ASF and is close to 80 km long. It is part of European route E80.

Route
The motorway connects Salon-de-Provence with Nîmes and merges with the N113 between Saint-Martin-de-Crau and Arles.

History
Its first section was opened south of Salon-de-Provence in 1970, at the same time as the section of the A7 between Sénas and Rognac.

In 1990, the portion between Nîmes and Arles was opened.  It was connected to Saint-Martin-de-Crau and Salon-de-Provence in 1996.

Junctions

Exchange A9-A54 Junction with A9 autoroute to Perpignan or Orange.
01 (Nîmes centre) Towns served: Nîmes     
Rest Area: Caissargues/Nîmes-Costières     
02 (Nîmes Garons) Towns served: Nîmes Airport     
Péage de Arles
03 (Saint-Gilles) Towns served: Saint-Gilles
Autoroute becomes the RN572 and then RN113 to Arles. 
04 (D570)
05 (Arles-Ouest)
06 (Arles-Sud)
07 (Arles-Est/D570)
08 (Raphèle-les-Arles)
09 (RN568) to Marseille
10 (St-Martin-de-Crau Ouest)
11 (St-Martin-de-Crau Sud)
12 (St-Martin-de-Crau Est) Towns served: St-Martin-de-Crau
Autoroute recommences.
Péage de St-Martin de Crau     
Rest Area: Le Merle     
13 (Salon ouest) Towns served: Salon-de-Provence      
14 (Grans) Towns served: Salon-de-Provence           
15 (Salon sud) Towns served: Salon-de-Provence           
Exchange A7-A54 Junction with the A7 to Orange and Aix.

Future
A new motorway is proposed skirting Arles, ensuring the continuity of A54. This would be an upgrade of the existing N113 and N572 south of Arles to autoroute standard and is known as the Contournement d'Arles or Arles bypass. This 24 km section is the final non-motorway section in an important transcontinental road link between Italy and Spain and is currently scheduled for 2021.

References

External links
 A54 Motorway in Saratlas

A54